Tubothalamea is a taxonomic class established for foraminiferans with tubular chambers. Includes the porcelaceous and agglutinated Miliolida and the monocrystalline and agglutinated Spirillinida. It is one of two classes of multichambered foraminifera based on  SSU rDNA molecular studies with consideration of major morphological trands, the other being the Globothalamea.

References

 
Foraminifera classes